Moka, or Moca, is a town located on the island of Bioko in Equatorial Guinea. The town is named after the Bubi King Möókáta, or King Moka, who ruled from 1835 to 1845 and again in 1875 through 1898 during the Bahítáari Dynasty. There is not many things to do in Moka, however there is a wildlife area called the Moka Wildlife Center BBPP

Populated places in Bioko Sur